The 16th BET Awards  were held at the Microsoft Theater in Los Angeles, California on June 26, 2016. The ceremony celebrated mass achievements in black entertainment and honored music, sports, television, and motion pictures released between April 1, 2015 and March 30, 2016. The nominees were announced on Friday, May 20, 2016, with  Drake leading the pack with 9 nominations, while Beyoncé and Rihanna both followed behind with 6. Beyoncé ended up winning the most awards with 5, including Video of the Year.

Beyoncé opened the show with a performance of "Freedom" with Kendrick Lamar. The act featured the 50+ foot long pool that is included in her set during The Formation World Tour, where she and her backup dancers perform the choreography barefoot. Another highlight from the show was the speech from actor and activist Jesse Williams, who spoke on topics such as racism and police brutality during his acceptance speech for the Humanitarian Award. However, the most anticipated moments of the night were the multiple tributes to Prince, who died in April 2016. Seven different performances paying homage to him were spread throughout the evening.

The awards ceremony was broadcast for the first time as a simulcast across 12 Viacom Media Networks properties. Outside of BET Networks operated channels BET & Centric, the show aired on the music based platforms of MTV & MTV2 and VH1 & VH1 Classic, Nickelodeon (first hour), Nick at Nite (final two hours), and TeenNick as well as general entertainment platforms of Comedy Central, Logo and Spike.

Performances

Nominations and Winners
The following is a list of winners and nominees. The nominations were announced on May 20, 2016.

Special awards 
 Lifetime Achievement Award - Samuel L. Jackson
 Humanitarian Award -  Jesse Williams

Controversy
Jesse Williams's humanitarian award speech was the subject of backlash from some Grey's Anatomy fans. The show's fans made a Change.org petition. The petition says that Williams "spewed a racist, hate speech against law enforcement and white people at the BET Awards." Fans also wanted him to get fired from the series. On the morning of July 5, 2016, where the petition garnered 7,000 signatures, Grey's Anatomy creator Shonda Rhimes responded to the petition by saying on Twitter in a tweet, "Um, people? Boo don't need a petition. #shondalandrules." However, the petition continued to see an increase in signatures.

References

External links
Official Site

BET Awards
2016 music awards
2016 awards
2016 awards in the United States